Rasheed Ibrahim Akanbi (born 9 May 1999) is a Nigerian professional footballer who plays as a forward for Sheriff Tiraspol.

Career
On 22 June 2022, he signed a contract with Moldovan Super Liga club Sheriff Tiraspol.

Career statistics

Club

References

External links

TFF Profile

1999 births
Living people
Sportspeople from Lagos
Association football forwards
Nigerian footballers
Menemenspor footballers
Kocaelispor footballers
TFF First League players
FC Sheriff Tiraspol players
Moldovan Super Liga players
Nigerian expatriate footballers
Expatriate footballers in Turkey
Nigerian expatriate sportspeople in Turkey
Expatriate footballers in Moldova
Nigerian expatriate sportspeople in Moldova